The swallow-tail or kingfish (Centroberyx lineatus) is a member of the family Berycidae. It is native to the Indian Ocean and Western Pacific Ocean off of Madagascar and from Australia to Japan. It can reach sizes of up to  TL.

References

External links
 Fishes of Australia : Centroberyx lineatus

External links
 
 

Berycidae
Marine fish of Southern Australia
Fish of Japan
Fish of Madagascar
Fish described in 1829
Taxa named by Georges Cuvier